The 1980–81 Iowa Hawkeyes men's basketball team represented the University of Iowa as members of the Big Ten Conference. The team was led by head coach Lute Olson, coaching in his 7th season at the school, and played their home games at the Iowa Field House. They finished the season 21–7 overall and 13–5 in Big Ten play. The Hawkeyes received an at-large bid to the NCAA Tournament as #3 seed in the Midwest Regional, but fell 60–56 to #6 seed Wichita State in the Round of 32 – a game played on the Shockers' home floor.

Roster

Schedule/results

|-
!colspan=9 style=| Non-Conference Regular Season

|-
!colspan=9 style=| Big Ten Regular Season

|-
!colspan=9 style=| NCAA Tournament

Rankings

References

Iowa
Iowa
Iowa Hawkeyes men's basketball seasons
Hawkeyes
Hawkeyes